Barefoot Boy may refer to:

 Barefoot Boy, album by Larry Coryell
 The Barefoot Boy (film), a 1923 American silent film
 Barefoot Boy (film), a 1938 children's adventure film
 "The Barefoot Boy", 1855 poem written by American Quaker poet John Greenleaf Whittier